Walberg or Wålberg is a surname. Notable people with the surname include:

Garry Walberg (1921–2012), American actor
Kaare Walberg (1912–1988), Norwegian ski jumper
Mark L. Walberg (born 1962), American actor and television personality
Rube Walberg (1896–1978), American baseball player
Siri Wålberg (born 1980), Norwegian musical artist
Tim Walberg (born 1951), American politician
Thore Wålberg (born 1953), Norwegian ice hockey player
Vance Walberg (born 1956), American basketball player and coach
Vicki-Lee Walberg (born 1975), English model

See also
 Wahlberg (surname)
 Walburg (disambiguation), includes a list of people with surname Walburg
 Wallberg (disambiguation), includes a list of people with surname Wallberg
 Wallburg (disambiguation), includes a list of people with surname Wallburg